Goremageddon: The Saw and the Carnage Done is the third studio album by Belgian death metal band Aborted. It was released in 2003. All but the last track feature samples of a medical and/or horror note. The title of the album and the title track are references to the title of a song by Neil Young, "The Needle and the Damage Done".

The 2009 reissued versions have a bonus cover of the Carcass song "Carnal Forge".

Track listing

Personnel
Sven "Svencho" de Caluwé – vocals
Bart Vergaert – guitar
Thijs De Cloedt – guitar
Frederik Vanmassenhove – bass
Dirk Verbeuren – drums

References

Aborted (band) albums
2003 albums
Albums produced by Jacob Hansen